Ryong'am station is a railway station in Ryongdŭng-rodongjagu, Kujang county, North P'yŏngan province, North Korea. It is the terminus of the Ryong'am Line of the Korean State Railway.

History

The station, originally called Yongdŭng station, was opened on 1 April 1934 by the Chosen Government Railway, along with the rest of the Yongdŭng Line (now called Ryong'am Line).

References

 Japanese Government Railways (1937), 鉄道停車場一覧. 昭和12年10月1日現在 (The List of the Stations as of 1 October 1937), Kawaguchi Printing Company, Tokyo, p 498

Railway stations in North Korea